Plectambonitoidea is a suborder of brachiopods containing the families:

Family Plectambonitidae
Family Taffiidae
Family Bimuriidae
Family Syndielasmatidae
Family Leptellinidae
Family Grorudiidae
Family Leptestiidae
Family Xenambonitidae
Family Hesperomenidae
Family Sowerbyellidae

References

Strophomenata